Blat    is a village in the  Marjeyoun District in southern Lebanon, located just north of Marjeyoun.

History
In 1596, it was named as a village,  Balat, in the Ottoman nahiya (subdistrict) of  Tibnin  under the liwa' (district) of Safad, with a population of  56  households and 2 bachelors, all Muslim. The villagers paid a  fixed tax-rate of 25 % on  agricultural products, such as wheat, barley, olive trees, vineyards, goats, beehives; in addition to occasional revenues, a press for olive oil or grape syrup and a water mill; a total of 6,000 akçe.

In 1838, Eli Smith noted Blat's population as being Metawileh.
 
On 27 December 1993, during the Israeli occupation of southern Lebanon, a Norwegian soldier was killed when an Israeli tank, stationed in neighbouring Aishiyeh, fired on his UNIFIL patrol outside Blat. The Indian Army contingent with UNIFIL had a small base camp in the village.

References

Bibliography

External links
Blat, Localiban

Populated places in Marjeyoun District